Omar Sharif Kale (born 21 June 2001) is a Somali footballer who plays as a defender for Horseed.

Club career
During the 2020–21 CAF Confederation Cup, Kale made two appearances for Horseed against Libyan club Al-Ittihad.

International career
On 9 December 2019, Kale made his debut for Somalia in a 2–0 loss against Uganda in the 2019 CECAFA Cup.

References

2001 births
Living people
Association football defenders
Somalian footballers
Somalia international footballers